WYMK (106.3 FM) is a non-commercial educational, religious-formatted radio station licensed to  Mount Kisco, New York and serving northern Westchester and Putnam counties. The station is owned and operated by Family Radio, a Christian radio ministry based in Nashville, Tennessee, and broadcasts the Family Radio - East satellite feed from its transmitter located in Bedford, New York.

History
The station went on the air as WVIP-FM, the sister station to WVIP (1310 AM), on January 15, 1964. On September 26, 1993, the station was sold and changed its call sign to WMJU, and on November 11, 1999 to WFAF.

Previously the station had been simulcasting WFAS-FM (103.9), an adult contemporary station licensed to Bronxville, New York. It was announced on February 25, 2012, that WFAF would begin simulcasting the country music station WDBY ("KICKS 105.5 FM") from Brookfield, Connecticut, on 106.3 starting on Thursday, March 1. The switch was moved up to February 29, 2012, at noon. To reflect the format change, Cumulus changed the call-sign from WFAF to WDVY.

WDVY was sold to Family Radio as part of the agreement to sell Family Radio's WFME in Newark, New Jersey, to Cumulus Media. The WDBY simulcast went silent on Monday, January 14, 2013, in preparation for Family Radio, the previous programming from 94.7, to move there along with the WFME calls. The station began playing traditional Christian hymns that afternoon and the full Family Radio feed on Tuesday, January 15, 2013.

After Family Radio acquired WQBU-FM on January 20, 2022, the group moved the WFME-FM call sign to the new station on January 26; 106.3 retains Family Radio broadcasting, under the call sign WYMK.

References

External links
  
 

Radio stations established in 1964
1964 establishments in New York (state)
Family Radio stations
YMK